Colada is one of the two best-known swords, along with Tizona, of El Cid Campeador. Won in combat from the Count of Barcelona, the sword was presented (along with Tizona) to his sons in law. According to the heroic verses of the Cantar de mio Cid, after his sons-in-law beat his daughters and then abandoned them on the side of the road, El Cid asked for his gifts to be returned. Afterward, he bestowed the sword upon one of his knights, Martín Antolínez.

Though its authenticity is doubted, a blade named Colada and traditionally identified with that of El Cid, with the addition of a 16th-century hilt, is preserved in the  Royal Palace of Madrid. It is necessary to add that El Cid's sword is displayed in the Museum as the "Tizona" Sword, the name Colada could have easily been appointed by popular culture since Bards at the time shared stories of folklorical nature which were far from being based on historical facts.

According to Sebastián de Covarrubias, Colada clearly means a sword made from "acero colado" ("cast steel"), a process of alloyed steel without impurities.

As with Tizona, Colada appears in the epic poem Cantar de mio Cid as a sword that frightens unworthy opponents if wielded by a brave warrior. El Cid gives the sword to Martín Antolínez as a present, and he uses it in the duel against the infante Diego González.

See also
Lobera

References

Cantar de mio Cid
Fictional swords
Medieval European swords
Mythological swords